Milton Jackson (January 1, 1923 – October 9, 1999), nicknamed "Bags", was an American jazz vibraphonist, usually thought of as a bebop player, although he performed in several jazz idioms. He is especially remembered for his cool swinging solos as a member of the Modern Jazz Quartet and his penchant for collaborating with hard bop and post-bop players.

A very expressive player, Jackson differentiated himself from other vibraphonists in his attention to variations on harmonics and rhythm. He was particularly fond of the twelve-bar blues at slow tempos. On occasion, Jackson also sang and played piano.

Biography
Jackson was born on January 1, 1923, in Detroit, Michigan, United States, the son of Manley Jackson and Lillie Beaty Jackson. Like many of his contemporaries, he was surrounded by music from an early age, particularly that of religious meetings: "Everyone wants to know where I got that funky style. Well, it came from church. The music I heard was open, relaxed, impromptu soul music" (quoted in Nat Hentoff's liner notes to Plenty, Plenty Soul). He started on guitar when he was seven, and then on piano at 11.

While attending Miller High School, he played drums in addition to timpani and violin and also sang in the choir. At 16, he sang professionally in a local touring gospel quartet called the Evangelist Singers. He took up the vibraphone at 16 after hearing Lionel Hampton play the instrument in Benny Goodman's band. Jackson was discovered by Dizzy Gillespie, who hired him for his sextet in 1945, then his larger ensembles. Jackson quickly acquired experience working with the most important figures in jazz of the era, including Woody Herman, Howard McGhee, Thelonious Monk, and Charlie Parker.

In the Gillespie big band, Jackson fell into a pattern that led to the founding of the Modern Jazz Quartet: Gillespie maintained a former swing tradition of a small group within a big band, and his included Jackson, pianist John Lewis, bassist Ray Brown, and drummer Kenny Clarke (considered a pioneer of the ride cymbal timekeeping that became the signature for bop and most jazz to follow) while the brass and reeds took breaks. When they decided to become a working group in their own right, around 1950, the foursome was known at first as the Milt Jackson Quartet, becoming the Modern Jazz Quartet (MJQ) in 1952. By that time Percy Heath had replaced Ray Brown.

Known at first for featuring Jackson's blues-heavy improvisations almost exclusively, in time the group came to split the difference between these and Lewis's more ambitious musical ideas. Lewis had become the group's musical director by 1955, the year Clarke departed in favour of Connie Kay, boiling the quartet down to a chamber jazz style, that highlighted the lyrical tension between Lewis's mannered, but roomy, compositions, and Jackson's unapologetic swing.

The MJQ had a long independent career of some two decades until disbanding in 1974, when Jackson split with Lewis. The group reformed in 1981, however, and continued until 1993, after which Jackson toured alone, performing in various small combos, although agreeing to periodic MJQ reunions. From the mid-1970s to the mid-1980s, Jackson recorded for Norman Granz's Pablo Records, including Jackson, Johnson, Brown & Company (1983), featuring Jackson with J. J. Johnson on trombone, Ray Brown on bass, backed by Tom Ranier on piano, guitarist John Collins, and drummer Roy McCurdy.

In 1989, Jackson was awarded an Honorary Doctorate of Music from the Berklee College of Music.

His composition "Bags' Groove" is a jazz standard ("Bags" was a nickname given to him by a bass player in Detroit. "Bags" referred to the bags under his eyes). He was featured on the NPR radio program Jazz Profiles. Some of his other signature compositions include "The Late, Late Blues" (for his album with Coltrane, Bags & Trane), "Bluesology" (an MJQ staple), and "Bags & Trane".

Jackson died of liver cancer in Manhattan, New York, at the age of 76. He was married to Sandra Whittington from 1959 until his death; the couple had a daughter.

Discography

As leader 

 1948: Howard McGhee and Milt Jackson (Savoy, 1955) with Howard McGhee
 1948-52: Wizard of the Vibes (Blue Note, 1952) with Thelonious Monk – a.k.a. Milt Jackson (Blue Note, 1956)
 1949-56: Roll 'Em Bags (Savoy, 1956)
 1949-56: Meet Milt Jackson (Savoy, 1956)
 1955: Milt Jackson Quartet (Prestige, 1955)
 1955: Opus de Jazz (Savoy, 1956)
 1956: Ballads & Blues (Atlantic, 1956)
 1956: The Jazz Skyline (Savoy, 1956)
 1956: Jackson's Ville (Savoy, 1956)
 1957: Plenty, Plenty Soul (Atlantic, 1957)
 1957: Bags & Flutes (Atlantic, 1957)
 1957-58: Soul Brothers with Ray Charles (Atlantic, 1958)
 1958: Soul Meeting with Ray Charles (Atlantic, 1961)
 1958: Bags' Opus (United Artists, 1959)
 1959: Bean Bags with Coleman Hawkins (Atlantic, 1960)
 1959: Bags & Trane with John Coltrane (Atlantic, 1961)
 1959: The Ballad Artistry of Milt Jackson (Atlantic, 1959)
 1960-61: Vibrations (Atlantic, 1964)
 1961: Very Tall with Oscar Peterson Trio (Verve, 1962)
 1961: Statements (Impulse!, 1962)
 1961: Bags Meets Wes! with Wes Montgomery (Riverside, 1962)
 1962: Big Bags (Riverside, 1962)
 1962: Invitation (Riverside, 1962)
 1962: For Someone I Love (Riverside, 1963)
 1963: Milt Jackson Quintet Live at the Village Gate (Riverside, 1963) – live
 1964: Much in Common with Ray Brown (Verve, 1964)
 1964: Jazz 'n' Samba (Impulse!, 1964)
 1964: In a New Setting (Limelight, 1965)
 1964-65: I/We Had a Ball with Art Blakey et al. (Limelight, 1965)
 1965: Ray Brown / Milt Jackson with Ray Brown (Verve, 1965)
 1965: Milt Jackson at the Museum of Modern Art (Limelight, 1965) – live
 1966: Born Free (Limelight, 1968)
 1968: Milt Jackson and the Hip String Quartet (Verve, 1968)
 1969: That's the Way It Is featuring Ray Brown (Impulse!, 1969) – live
 1969: Just the Way It Had to Be featuring Ray Brown (Impulse!, 1970) – live
 1969: Memphis Jackson with the Ray Brown Big Band (Impulse!, 1970)
 1971: Reunion Blues with Oscar Peterson (MPS, 1971)
 1972: Sunflower (CTI, 1973)
 1972: Cherry with Stanley Turrentine (CTI, 1972)
 1972-73: Goodbye with Hubert Laws (CTI, 1974)
 1974: Olinga (CTI, 1974)
 1975: The Milt Jackson Big 4 (Pablo, 1975) – live
 1975: The Big 3 with Joe Pass and Ray Brown (Pablo, 1975)
1976: At The Kosei Nenkin (Pablo, 1977)[2LP] – live
 1976: Feelings (Pablo, 1976)
 1977: Quadrant with Joe Pass, Ray Brown, and Mickey Roker (Pablo, 1977) 
  1977: Soul Fusion with The Monty Alexander Trio (Pablo, 1978)
  1977: Montreux '77 & Ray Brown (Pablo, 1977)
 1979: Loose Walk with Sonny Stitt (Palcoscenico, 1980)
 1980: All Too Soon: The Duke Ellington Album with Ray Brown, Mickey Roker & Joe Pass (Pablo, 1980)
 1980: Night Mist (Pablo/OJC, 1981)
 1981: Ain't But a Few of Us Left with Oscar Peterson (Pablo, 1981)
 1982: A London Bridge (Pablo, 1988) – live
 1982: Mostly Duke  (Pablo, 1991) – live
 1982: In London: Memories of Thelonious Sphere Monk (Pablo, 1982)
 1983: Jackson, Johnson, Brown & Company with J. J. Johnson (Pablo, 1983)
 1983: Two of the Few with Oscar Peterson (Pablo, 1983)
 1983: Soul Route (Pablo, 1984)
 1988: Bebop (EastWest Records America, 1988)
 1993?: Reverence and Compassion (Qwest/Warner Bros., 1993)
 1994?: The Prophet Speaks with Joshua Redman and Joe Williams (Qwest/WB, 1994)
 1995?: Burnin' in the Woodhouse (Qwest/WB, 1995)
 1997?: Sa Va Bella (For Lady Legends)(Qwest/WB, 1997)
 1998: EXPLOSIVE! Milt Jackson Meets the Clayton-Hamilton Jazz Orchestra (Qwest/WB, 1999)
 1998: The Very Tall Band with Oscar Peterson and Ray Brown(Telarc, 1999) – live at Blue Note

Posthumous release
 At the Kosei Nenkin vol. 2: Centerpiece (Pablo, 2002) – mostly unissued tracks from the 1976 Japanese live session

Compilations 
 All Star Bags (Blue Note, 1976)[2LP] – recorded in 1952-57
 Milt Jackson (Quintessence Jazz Series) (Pickwick, 1979)
 The Best of Milt Jackson (Pablo, 1980)

With the Modern Jazz Quartet 

 Vendome (Prestige, 1952)
 Modern Jazz Quartet, II (Prestige, 1955)
 Concorde (Prestige, 1955)
 Fontessa (Atlantic, 1956)
 The Modern Jazz Quartet Plays No Sun in Venice (Atlantic, 1957)
 The Modern Jazz Quartet (Atlantic, 1957)
 Third Stream Music (Atlantic, 1957) – recorded in 1959–60. including Sketch for Double String Quartet (1959).
 The Modern Jazz Quartet and the Oscar Peterson Trio at the Opera House (Verve, 1957)
 The Modern Jazz Quartet at Music Inn Volume 2 (Atlantic, 1958)
 Music from Odds Against Tomorrow (United Artists, 1959) – soundtrack
 Pyramid (Atlantic, 1960)
 The Modern Jazz Quartet & Orchestra (Atlantic, 1960)
 European Concert (Atlantic, 1960) – live
 The Comedy (Atlantic, 1962) – recorded in 1960-62
 Lonely Woman (Atlantic, 1962)
 A Quartet is a Quartet is a Quartet (Atlantic, 1963)
 Collaboration with Laurindo Almeida (Atlantic, 1964)
 The Modern Jazz Quartet Plays George Gershwin's Porgy and Bess (Atlantic, 1965) – recorded in 1964–65
 Jazz Dialogue with the All-Star Jazz Band (Atlantic, 1965)
 Concert in Japan '66 (Atlantic [Japan], 1966)
 Blues at Carnegie Hall (Atlantic, 1966)
 Place Vendôme with The Swingle Singers (Philips, 1966)
 Under the Jasmin Tree (Apple, 1968) – recorded in 1967
 Space (Apple, 1969)
 Plastic Dreams (Atlantic, 1971)
 The Legendary Profile (Atlantic, 1972)
 In Memoriam (Little David, 1973)
 Blues on Bach (Atlantic, 1973)
 The Last Concert (Atlantic, 1974)
 The Only Recorded Performance of Paul Desmond With The Modern Jazz Quartet with Paul Desmond (Finesse/Columbia, 1981) – recorded in 1971
 Reunion at Budokan 1981 (Pablo, 1981)
 Together Again: Live at the Montreux Jazz Festival '82 (Pablo, 1982)
 Echoes (Pablo, 1984)
 Topsy: This One's for Basie (Pablo, 1985)
 Three Windows (Atlantic, 1987)
 For Ellington (East West, 1988)
 MJQ & Friends: A 40th Anniversary Celebration (Atlantic, 1994) – recorded in 1992–93
 Dedicated to Connie (Atlantic, 1995) – live recorded in 1960

As sideman 

With Miles Davis
 Quintet / Sextet (Prestige, 1956) – recorded in 1955
 Bags' Groove (Prestige, 1957) – recorded in 1954
 Miles Davis and the Modern Jazz Giants (Prestige, 1959) – recorded in 1954–56

With Dizzy Gillespie
 The Complete RCA Victor Recordings (Bluebird, 1995) – recorded in 1937–49
 Dee Gee Days: The Savoy Sessions (Savoy, 1976) – recorded in 1951–52
 The Dizzy Gillespie Big 7 (Pablo, 1975)
 Dizzy Gillespie Jam (Pablo, 1977)
 Musician, Composer, Raconteur (Pablo, 1982) – recorded in 1981

With Oscar Peterson
 Very Tall (Verve, 1962) – recorded in 1961
 Reunion Blues (MPS, 1971)
 The Oscar Peterson Big 6 at the Montreux Jazz Festival 1975 (Pablo, 1975)

With others
Cannonball Adderley, Things Are Getting Better (Riverside, 1959) – recorded in 1958
 Count Basie, Count Basie Jam Session at the Montreux Jazz Festival 1975 (Pablo, 1975)
 Wini Brown, Miss Brown For You (Savoy Jazz, 1986) – recorded in 1947–49
 Benny Carter, The King (Pablo, 1976)
 Kenny Clarke, Telefunken Blues (Savoy, 1955) – recorded in 1954–55
 Roy Eldridge, What It's All About (Pablo, 1976)
 Quincy Jones, I/We Had a Ball (Limelight, 1965) – recorded in 1964-65
 Hank Mobley, Hank Mobley and His All Stars (Blue Note, 1957)
 Don Sebesky, Giant Box (CTI, 1973)
 Stanley Turrentine, Cherry (CTI, 1972)
 Dinah Washington, Mellow Mama (Delmark, 1992) – recorded in 1945

References

External links 
 
 Milt Jackson at the Hard Bop Homepage
 
 

African-American jazz musicians
American jazz vibraphonists
Bebop musicians
1923 births
1999 deaths
Jazz musicians from Michigan
Jazz musicians from New York (state)
Musicians from Detroit
Michigan State University alumni
Inner City Records artists
Savoy Records artists
Blue Note Records artists
Riverside Records artists
Atlantic Records artists
Impulse! Records artists
Warner Records artists
Pablo Records artists
People from Teaneck, New Jersey
20th-century American musicians
Deaths from cancer in New York (state)
Deaths from liver cancer
Modern Jazz Quartet members
Burials at Woodlawn Cemetery (Bronx, New York)
CTI Records artists
20th-century African-American musicians
Jazz vibraphonists
Oscar Peterson Trio members